Privilege (Abridged) is the fourth full-length album from indie rock ensemble Parenthetical Girls, released on February 14, 2013. In December 2012, it was announced via the Parenthetical Girls Twitter account that there would be an official, abridged version of the Privilege series of EPs, which began in 2010.

The album includes a DVD featuring "[seven] promotional films, blood draw documentation, live performances, [and] other ephemera."

Track listing
Evelyn McHale – 3:49
The Common Touch – 4:01
Careful Who You Dance With – 2:39
For All The Final Girls – 3:06
The Pornographer – 3:16
Sympathy For Spastics – 2:28
Weaknesses – 3:21
A Note To Self – 3:10
Young Throats – 4:02
On Death & Endearments – 4:38
The Privilege – 4:52
Curtains – 4:04

References

External links
 Trailer for the album

Parenthetical Girls albums
2013 albums